The 1971 Swedish speedway season was the 1971 season of motorcycle speedway in Sweden.

Individual

Individual Championship
The 1971 Swedish Individual Speedway Championship final was held on 2 October in Stockholm. Göte Nordin won the Swedish Championship for the second time.

Junior Championship
 
Winner - Lars Inge Hultberg

Team

Team Championship
Bysarna won division 1 and were declared the winners of the Swedish Speedway Team Championship for the first time. The Bysarna team included Sören Sjösten, Tommy Johansson and Christer Löfqvist.

Dackarna and Smederna won the second division east and west respectively, while Valsarna won the third division.

See also 
 Speedway in Sweden

References

Speedway leagues
Professional sports leagues in Sweden
Swedish
Seasons in Swedish speedway